The 2015 Georgia State Panthers softball team represented Georgia State University in the 2015 NCAA Division I softball season. The Panthers competed in the Sun Belt Conference and were led by five-year head coach Roger Kincaid. Georgia State played its home games at the Robert E. Heck Softball Complex in Panthersville, Georgia.

Schedule

! style="background:#0000FF;color:white;"| Regular Season
|- valign="top" 

|- align="center" bgcolor="#ffccc"
| 1 || February 12 || #17  || Auburn, AL || 8–20 || 0–1 || –
|- align="center" bgcolor="#ccffcc"
| 2 || February 13 ||  || Auburn, AL || 8–7 || 1–1 || –
|- align="center" bgcolor="#ccffcc"
| 3 || February 13 ||  || Auburn, AL || 10–4 || 2–1 || –
|- align="center" bgcolor="#ccffcc"
| 4 || February 14 ||  || Auburn, AL || 7–6 || 3–1 || –
|- align="center" bgcolor="#ffccc"
| 5 || February 18 || Auburn || Auburn, AL || 0–10 || 3–2 || –
|- align="center" bgcolor="#ccffcc"
| 6 || February 20 ||  || Bob Heck Field || 16–8 || 4–2 || –
|- align="center" bgcolor="#ccffcc"
| 7 || February 20 || Savannah State || Bob Heck Field || 14–5 || 5–2 || –
|- align="center" bgcolor="#ccffcc"
| 8 || February 21 ||  || Bob Heck Field || 10–4 || 6–2 || –
|- align="center" bgcolor="#ccffcc"
| 9 || February 21 || #21  || Bob Heck Field || 9–2 || 7–2 || –
|- align="center" bgcolor="#ccffcc"
| 10 || February 27 ||  || Clearwater, FL || 16–2 || 8–2 || –
|- align="center" bgcolor="#ccffcc"
| 11 || February 27 ||  || Clearwater, FL || 6–1 || 9–2 || –
|-

|- align="center" bgcolor="#ccffcc"
| 12 || March 1 || East Carolina || Clearwater, FL || 4–3 || 10–2 || –
|- align="center" bgcolor="#ccffcc"
| 13 || March 1 ||  || Clearwater, FL || 5–2 || 11–2 || –
|- align="center" bgcolor="#ccffcc"
| 14 || March 4 ||  || Macon, GA || 3–0 || 12–2 || –
|- align="center" bgcolor="#ccffcc"
| 15 || March 4 || Mercer || Macon, GA || 8–5 || 13–2 || –
|- align="center" bgcolor="#ccffcc"
| 16 || March 7 ||   || Bob Heck Field || 15–3 || 14–2 || 1–0
|- align="center" bgcolor="#ccffcc"
| 17 || March 7 || Troy || Bob Heck Field || 4–0 || 15–2 || 2–0
|- align="center" bgcolor="#ccffcc"
| 18 || March 8 || Troy || Bob Heck Field || 4–3 || 16–2 || 3–0
|- align="center" bgcolor="#ccffcc"
| 19 || March 14 ||  || San Marcos, TX || 5–2 || 17–2 || 4–0
|- align="center" bgcolor="#ccffcc"
| 20 || March 14 || Texas State || San Marcos, TX || 13–4 || 18–2 || 5–0
|- align="center" bgcolor="#ffccc"
| 21 || March 15 || Texas State || San Marcos, TX || 4–5 || 18–3 || 5–1
|- align="center" bgcolor="#ccffcc"
| 22 || March 17 ||  || Bob Heck Field || 4–2 || 19–3 || 5–1
|- align="center" bgcolor="#ffccc"
| 23 || March 18 || #4 Alabama || Tuscaloosa, AL || 1–9 || 19–4 || 5–1
|- align="center" bgcolor="#ccffcc"
| 24 || March 20 ||  || Lawrence, KS || 10–2 || 20–4 || 5–1
|- align="center" bgcolor="#ffccc"
| 25 || March 20 ||  || Lawrence, KS || 9–10 || 20–5 || 5–1
|- align="center" bgcolor="#ccffcc"
| 26 || March 21 || Eastern Michigan || Lawrence, KS || 9–3 || 21–5 || 5–1
|- align="center" bgcolor="#ffccc"
| 27 || March 21 || #22 Kansas || Lawrence, KS || 6–8 || 21–6 || 5–1
|- align="center" bgcolor="#ffccc"
| 28 || March 22 || #22 Kansas || Lawrence, KS || 4–5 || 21–7 || 5–1
|- align="center" bgcolor="#ccffcc"
| 29 || March 24 || Georgia Tech || Bob Heck Field || 7–6 || 22–7 || 5–1
|- align="center" bgcolor="#ccffcc"
| 30 || March 26 ||  || Bob Heck Field || 11–3 || 23–7 || 5–1
|- align="center" bgcolor="#ffccc"
| 31 || March 28 || #24  || Bob Heck Field || 7–8 || 23–8 || 5–2
|- align="center" bgcolor="#ffccc"
| 32 || March 28 || #24 South Alabama || Bob Heck Field || 11–13 || 23–9 || 5–3
|- align="center" bgcolor="#ffccc"
| 33 || March 29 || #24 South Alabama || Bob Heck Field || 3–8 || 23–10 || 5–4
|-

|- align="center" bgcolor="#ffccc"
| 34 || April 1 ||  || Bob Heck Field || 1–3 || 23–11 || 5–4
|- align="center" bgcolor="#ffccc"
| 35 || April 1 || Furman || Bob Heck Field || 2–6 || 23–12 || 5–4
|- align="center" bgcolor="#ffccc"
| 36 || April 3 || #10  || Lafayette, LA || 1–10 || 23–13 || 5–5
|- align="center" bgcolor="#ffccc"
| 37 || April 4 || #10 Louisiana || Lafayette, LA || 2–10 || 23–14 || 5–6
|- align="center" bgcolor="#ffccc"
| 38 || April 4 || #10 Louisiana || Lafayette, LA || 0–8 || 23–15 || 5–7
|- align="center" bgcolor="#ccffcc"
| 39 || April 7 ||  || Bob Heck Field || 11–10 || 24–15 || 5–7
|- align="center" bgcolor="#ccffcc"
| 40 || April 7 || Tennessee Tech || Bob Heck Field || 12–1 || 25–15 || 5–7
|- align="center" bgcolor="#ccffcc"
| 41|| April 8 || Kennesaw State || Kennesaw, GA || 12–4 || 26–15 || 5–7
|- align="center" bgcolor="#ccffcc"
| 42 || April 11 ||  || Bob Heck Field || 2–1 || 27–15 || 6–7
|- align="center" bgcolor="#ccffcc"
| 43 || April 11 || Appalachian State || Bob Heck Field || 10–2 || 28–15 || 7–7
|- align="center" bgcolor="#ffccc"
| 44 || April 12 || Appalachian State || Bob Heck Field || 5–14 || 28–16 || 7–8
|- align="center" bgcolor="#ccffcc"
| 45 || April 18 ||  || Arlington, TX || 6–1 || 29–16 || 8–8
|- align="center" bgcolor="#ffccc"
| 46 || April 18 || UT Arlington || Arlington, TX || 2–5 || 29–17 || 8–9
|- align="center" bgcolor="#ccffcc"
| 47 || April 19 || UT Arlington || Arlington, TX || 5–4 || 30–17 || 9–9
|- align="center" bgcolor="#ffccc"
| 48|| April 22 || #14  || Athens, GA || 6–14 || 30–18 || 9–9
|- align="center" bgcolor="#ccffcc"
| 49 || April 24 ||  || Bob Heck Field || 11–2 || 31–18 || 10–9
|- align="center" bgcolor="#ccffcc"
| 50 || April 24 || ULM || Bob Heck Field || 10–8 || 32–18 || 11–9
|- align="center" bgcolor="#ffccc"
| 51 || April 26 || ULM || Bob Heck Field || 3–6 || 32–19 || 11–10
|- align="center" bgcolor="#ffccc"
| 52 || April 27 || #10 Florida State || Bob Heck Field || 3–6 || 32–20 || 11–10
|-

|- align="center" bgcolor="#ccffcc"
| 53 || May 1 ||  || Statesboro, GA || 4–1 || 33–20 || 12–10
|- align="center" bgcolor="#ccffcc"
| 54 || May 2 ||  Georgia Southern || Statesboro, GA || 19–6 || 34–20 || 13–10
|- align="center" bgcolor="#ccffcc"
| 55 || May 2 || Georgia Southern || Statesboro, GA || 10–7 || 35–20 || 14–10
|-

|- align="center" bgcolor="#ccffcc"
| 56 || May 6 || Georgia Southern || San Marcos, TX || 8–0 || 36–20 || 14–10
|- align="center" bgcolor="#ccffcc"
| 57 || May 6 || Troy || San Marcos, TX  || 9–3 || 37–20 || 14–10
|- align="center" bgcolor="#ffccc"
| 58 || May 7 || #10 Louisiana ||San Marcos, TX  || 2–10 || 37–21 || 14–10
|- align="center" bgcolor="#ccffcc"
| 59 || May 8 || || San Marcos, TX  || 8–6 || 38–21 || 14–10
|- align="center" bgcolor="#ffccc"
| 60|| May 8 || #23 South Alabama || San Marcos, TX || 1–3 || 38–22 || 14–10
|-

|-
|

References

Georgia State
Georgia State Panthers softball seasons